Călugărul River may refer to:

 Călugărul, a tributary of the Conțeasca in Iași County
 Călugărul, a tributary of the Horăița in Neamț County

See also 
 Călugăreasa River (disambiguation)
 Izvorul Călugărului River (disambiguation)
 Călugăreni (disambiguation)